Francis Xaver Hennemann S.A.C. (27 October 1882 – 17 January 1951), was a Titular Bishop in South Africa.

Biography 
Hennemann was born in Germany in Holthausen (Schmallenberg). The son of a tradesman visiting the school in Fredeburg (Schmallenberg). In 1907 he became a priest ordained. Pope Pius X appointed him on 16 July 1913 to Titular Bishop of Coptus and ordered him coadjutor of the seriously ill Vicar Apostolic of Cameroon, Heinrich Vieter. As of 7 November 1914 he was appointed Vicar Apostolic of Roman Catholic Archdiocese of Yaoundé. Because of his success made him the pope 1933 to Vicar Apostolic of Roman Catholic Archdiocese of Cape Town. On 2 September 1948 written Hennemann a letter, addressed to all the clergy of his diocese. In this letter he condemned the Nationalist government's apartheid policy as "noxious, unchristian and destructive". He died in 1951 in Cape Town.

Publications

Author 
Sieben Jahre Missionsarbeit in Kamerun, Zeitfragen aus der Weltmission, 1918
Zwei Grundfragen afrikanischer Missionsarbeit, ZM 9, 1919
Die religiösen Vorstellungen der heidnischen Bewohner Süd-Kameruns, Ehrengabe dt. Wiss., Franz Fessler (Hrsg.), 1920
Werden und Wirken eines Afrikamissionars. Erlebtes und Erschautes., Pallottiner Verlag Limburg an der Lahn, 1922

References 

1951 deaths
Roman Catholic anti-apartheid activists
White South African anti-apartheid activists
Pallottine bishops
German Roman Catholic missionaries
Roman Catholic missionaries in Cameroon
1882 births
People from Hochsauerlandkreis
German colonial people in Kamerun
Roman Catholic missionaries in South Africa
20th-century Roman Catholic titular archbishops
German emigrants to South Africa
20th-century Roman Catholic archbishops in South Africa
Roman Catholic bishops of Cape Town
Roman Catholic bishops of Yaoundé